The 1948 college football season finished with two unbeaten and untied teams: Michigan and Clemson. Michigan was the first-place choice for the majority of the voters (192 of 333) in the AP Poll, but did not play in the postseason because of a no-repeat rule for Big Nine schools. Notre Dame, second in the AP Poll, tied USC 14–14 at the end of the regular season, but did not participate in any bowl per university policy at the time. Northwestern beat California 20–14 in the Rose Bowl, and Clemson defeated Missouri by one point in the Gator Bowl.

Air travel to away games (as opposed to rail travel) became increasingly popular with college football programs in the late 1940s.

The NCAA began permitting the use of small 1-inch rubber "tees" (not the same tee used for kickoffs) for extra point and field goal attempts beginning this year; they were outlawed in 1989.

Conference and program changes

Conference changes
One conferences began play in 1948:
Ohio Valley Conference – an active NCAA Division I FCS conference; began play with six teams from Kentucky and Indiana.
One conference played its final season in 1948:
Dakota-Iowa Athletic Conference – conference active since the 1946 season
Two conferences changed their names prior to the season:
After the Big Six Conference, still officially known as the Missouri Valley Intercollegiate Athletic Association, added Colorado, the conference's unofficial name became the Big Seven Conference.
The Washington Intercollegiate Conference changed its name to the Evergreen Conference, the name it would retain until the conference's demise after the 1984 season.

Membership changes

September
The Associated Press did not poll the writers until the fourth week of the season.  Among the five teams that had been ranked highest in 1947 (Notre Dame, Michigan, SMU, Penn State, and Texas), all but Penn State began play on September 25.  Notre Dame edged Purdue 28–27, Michigan won at Michigan State, 13–7,  and SMU won at Pittsburgh, 33–14.  The Texas Longhorns lost at North Carolina, 34–7.  Northwestern beat UCLA, in Los Angeles, 19–0.  In Baltimore, California beat Navy, 21–7.  Army beat visiting Villanova 28–0.

October
October 2: In Pittsburgh, Notre Dame shut out Pitt, 40–0, while in Dallas, SMU defeated Texas Tech 41–6.  Penn State beat Bucknell 35–0, Michigan beat Oregon 14–0.  North Carolina won at Georgia 21–14.  Army beat Lafayette 54–7.  Northwestern beat Purdue 21–0.  When the first poll was issued, Notre Dame had fewer first place votes than North Carolina (50 vs. 55), but ten more points overall (1,200 to 1,190)  Northwestern was third, followed by SMU and Army.  Though unbeaten, Michigan was ranked 7th, after Georgia Tech.

October 9: No. 1 Notre Dame beat Michigan State 26–7.  No. 2 North Carolina won at Wake Forest, 28–6, and was ranked first in the next poll.  No. 3 Northwestern beat No. 8 Minnesota 19–16.   No. 4 SMU lost at Missouri, 20–14.  No. 5 Army won at Illinois, 26–21.  No. 7 Michigan, which had won at No. 15 Purdue, 40–0, rose to 4th.

October 16: No. 1 North Carolina beat N.C. State 14–0, but dropped to third in the next poll.  No. 2 Notre Dame won at Nebraska 44–13.  In Ann Arbor, Michigan, No. 3 Northwestern faced Big Nine rival No. 4 Michigan, and the home team Wolverines won 28–0.  No. 5 Army defeated Harvard 20–7.  Michigan moved up to first place in the next poll, and No. 6 California (which beat Oregon State 42–0) moved to No. 4, with Northwestern dropping out of the Top Five.

October 23: In Minneapolis, No. 1 Michigan beat No. 13 Minnesota 27–14, and No. 2 Notre Dame won at Iowa 27–12.  No. 3 North Carolina beat visiting LSU 34–7.  In Seattle, No. 4 California blanked Washington 21–0, and No. 5 Army won at No. 12 Cornell 27–6. The top five remained the same in the next poll.
 
October 30:  No. 1 Michigan beat Illinois 28–20, while in Baltimore, No. 2 Notre Dame beat Navy 41–7.  No. 3 North Carolina won at Tennessee 14–7.  In Los Angeles, No. 4 California beat USC, 13–7.  No. 5 Army beat Virginia Tech 49–7.  In the next poll, Notre Dame was ranked at the new number one, followed by Michigan, North Carolina, Army, and California.

November
November 6: No. 1 Notre Dame won at Indiana 42–6. No. 2 Michigan beat visiting Navy 35–0.  No. 3 North Carolina was tied by William & Mary, 7–7.  No. 4 Army defeated Stanford at Yankee Stadium in New York, 43–0, while  
No. 5 California beat visiting UCLA 28–13. Michigan was elevated to No. 1 in the next poll, followed by Notre Dame, Army, and California. No. 14 Penn State, which had shut out No. 7 Pennsylvania in Philadelphia 13–0, was moved up to No. 5.

November 13:  No. 1 Michigan beat Indiana 54–0.  No. 2 Notre Dame beat No. 8 Northwestern 12–7.  No. 3 Army won at No. 17 Pennsylvania 26–20.  No. 4 California beat Washington State 44–14.  No. 5 Penn State beat Temple 47–0, but still dropped in the next poll.  It switched spots with No. 6 North Carolina, which moved up after a win at Maryland 49–20.

November 20: No. 1 Michigan closed its season with a 13–3 win at No. 18 Ohio State.  No. 2 Notre Dame and No. 3 Army were both idle.  No. 4 California beat Stanford 7–6.  No. 5 North Carolina beat Duke 20–0. The next poll switched North Carolina to No. 4 and California to No. 5, with the top three remaining the same.

November 27:  No. 1 Michigan, which had completed its season, had 105 of 190 first place votes.  No. 2 Notre Dame defeated Washington 46–0.  The annual Army–Navy Game in Philadelphia pitted unbeaten (8–0–0) and No. 3 Army against winless (0–8–0) Navy, and 102,000 fans turned out to watch the mismatch, including President Truman.  It was a surprise when the Midshipmen scored first, but Army went ahead 21–14 after three quarters.  In the fourth quarter, Navy pushed the Cadets back to their own goal line, and took the punt at midfield.  In six plays, Navy drove down to the four yard line, and Bill Hawkins crashed into the end zone to make it 21–20.  Roger Drew added the point after to ruin Army's perfect record, 21–21.  No. 4 North Carolina won at Virginia 34–12, and No. 5 California had finished its season.  The final poll was released on November 29, although some colleges had not completed their schedules. Michigan, Notre Dame, North Carolina, and California were the top four, with Oklahoma (which had won its last nine games in a row after a narrow season-opening loss to Santa Clara) at No. 5.

On December 4, No. 2 Notre Dame‘s perfect record was compromised in Los Angeles with a 14–14 tie against unranked USC.

Conference standings

Major conference standings

Independents

Minor conferences

Minor conference standings

Rankings

Bowl games

Heisman Trophy voting
The Heisman Trophy is given to the year's most outstanding player

Source:

See also
 1948 College Football All-America Team

References